Jennifer Lucy Hochschild (born September 17, 1950) is an American political scientist. She serves as the Henry LaBarre Jayne Professor of Government, Professor of African and African American Studies and Harvard College Professor at Harvard University. She is also a member of the faculty at Harvard's Graduate School of Education and John F. Kennedy School of Government.

Education 
Hochschild received her undergraduate degree from Oberlin College, and was inducted into Phi Beta Kappa.

Career 
Hochschild was the 2015–2016 President of the American Political Science Association.

In 2019, Hochschild was on the ad hoc committee involved in denying tenure to Lorgia García Peña, an Afro-Latina professor in the Department of Romance Languages and Literatures, saying Peña's work was "not research, but activism."

In February 2022, Hochschild was one of 38 Harvard faculty to sign a letter to The Harvard Crimson defending Professor John Comaroff, who had been found to have violated the university's sexual and professional conduct policies. The letter defended Comaroff as "an excellent colleague, advisor and committed university citizen" and expressed dismay over his being sanctioned by the university. After students filed a lawsuit with detailed allegations of Comaroff's actions and the university's failure to respond, Hochschild was one of several signatories to say that she wished to retract her signature.

Works
 What’s Fair: American Beliefs and Distributive Justice (Harvard University Press, 1981)
 The New American Dilemma: Liberal Democracy and School Desegregation (Yale University Press, 1984)
 Facing Up to the American Dream: Race, Class and the Soul of the Nation (Princeton University Press, 1995)
 ed. Social Policies for Children with Sara McLanahan and Irwin Garfinkel (Brookings Institution, 1996)
 The American Dream and the Public Schools with Nathan Scovronick (Oxford University Press, 2003)
 Creating a New Racial Order: How Immigration, Multiracialism, Genomics, and the Young Can Remake Race in America with Vesla Weaver and Traci Burch (Princeton University Press, 2012)
 ed. Outsiders No More? Models of Immigrant Political Incorporation with Jacqueline Chattopadhyay, Claudine Gay, and Michael Jones-Correa (Oxford University Press, 2013)

References

1950 births
Living people
Yale University alumni
Harvard University faculty
American women non-fiction writers
American women academics
21st-century American women
Harvard Extension School faculty